Alain David Jourgensen (born Alejandro Ramírez Casas; October 9, 1958) is a Cuban-American singer, musician and music producer. Closely related with the independent record label Wax Trax! Records, his musical career spans four decades. He is best known as the frontman and lyricist of the industrial metal band Ministry, which he founded in 1981 and of which he remains the only constant member. He was the primary musician of several Ministry-related projects, such as Revolting Cocks, Lard, and Buck Satan and the 666 Shooters. He (Jourgensen) is regarded as one of the most prominent figures of industrial music, influencing numerous other groups and musicians, both in alternative and industrial-associated acts.

Born in Havana shortly before the Cuban Revolution of 1959, Jourgensen moved to the United States with his family at age of three, and was raised mainly in Chicago and Breckenridge, Colorado. He developed an interest in music at a young age, and was involved in several short-lived bands, as well as briefly performing in the backing band of drag performer Divine. 

Jourgensen formed Ministry in 1981 in Chicago and received significant attention from music press regarding the band's 1983 debut studio album, With Sympathy. His  subsequent releases in the 1980s, most prominently Ministry's The Land of Rape and Honey (1988) and The Mind Is a Terrible Thing to Taste (1989), showcased his stylistic transition; in the early 1990s, he achieved mainstream success with Ministry's fifth studio album, Psalm 69: The Way to Succeed and the Way to Suck Eggs (1992). The next few years were marked by publicity surrounding Jourgensen's substance abuse which negatively affected his creative output and resulted in a period of severe depression; during this time, Jourgensen and Ministry appeared in the 2001 Steven Spielberg film A.I. Artificial Intelligence. 

In 2005, Jourgensen established his own record label, 13th Planet Records, through which several Ministry records, among others, were released until the early 2010s. Currently Jourgensen and Ministry are signed to Nuclear Blast Records

Early life 
Alejandro Ramírez Casas was born in Havana, Cuba, on October 9, 1958, the son of Margarita "Maggie" Brouwer (born c. 1942) and Gualberto  Ramírez Casas (born c. 1936), and the grandson of Julio Brouwer, a biologist. Jourgensen's extended family has Dutch and Spanish heritage. In 1961, following the fall of Fulgencio Batista's regime and rise of Fidel Castro to power, his family relocated to Florida. In 1964, Margarita Brouwer married Ed Jourgensen, a stock car driver and mechanic for Formula One driver Dan Gurney. She adopted his surname for herself and her son.

Jourgensen was raised in Chicago, Illinois and 
in Breckenridge, Colorado where he graduated from Summit County High School in Frisco, Colorado in 1976. He was a fan of artists such as Liberace, The Beatles, Black Sabbath, Hawkwind, Pink Floyd, Charles Mingus, and Miles Davis.

Jourgensen eventually attended the University of Illinois Chicago, after briefly enrolling at both the University of Northern Colorado and the University of Colorado. He worked as a radio DJ after college until he decided to pursue a career as a professional musician.

Professional life

Ministry 

Jourgensen formed Ministry in 1981 after leaving Special Affect, a new wave/synth-pop band (notably including Frankie Nardiello, founding member (as Groovie Mann) of My Life With The Thrill Kill Kult and drummer Harry Rushakoff of Concrete Blonde). Early singles by Ministry and Jourgensen's other projects were released on Wax Trax! Records. He also produced Skinny Puppy's Rabies album. During that time, Jourgensen befriended Nivek Ogre, who later toured with Ministry.

The band broke into the mainstream with 1992's Psalm 69: The Way to Succeed and the Way to Suck Eggs album. Its opening track, "N.W.O.", was nominated for a 1993 Grammy Award for Best Metal Performance, losing to Nine Inch Nails' "Wish". However, its next album, Filth Pig (1996), divided their fan base, leading to a commercial decline that became evident when Warner Bros. Records dropped them from the label in 2001.

Ministry's next albums, Rio Grande Blood (2006) and The Last Sucker (2007), as well as the 2006 Revolting Cocks album Cocked and Loaded, were released on Jourgensen's new record label, 13th Planet Records, which he formed after falling out with the mainstream agendas of major industry labels.

At the specific request of director Stanley Kubrick, Jourgensen appeared with Ministry in the film A.I.: Artificial Intelligence. He related his conversation with Kubrick in an interview:

Well, first of all, I hung up on him. I thought it was a crank call. His secretary was calling and I was like, 'Yeah, right.' Click. And then he called back personally and then talked to me, and I was just freaked out. I mean, who wouldn't be freaked out? Here's this eccentric American God living in the countryside of England, and he's calling me up in Austin, Texas, and saying he wants me to do the music for his film and he wants me to be in his film and he's famous and all that. I didn't even believe it.

Ministry continued its involvement with the film project after Kubrick's death, and Jourgensen revealed that after initial tension with Steven Spielberg, partly due to Jourgensen's prank when he claimed being told that "A.I." stood for "Anal Intruder" and threatening to walk off production because it wasn't a porn film, he and Spielberg enjoyed a friendly relationship, with two compositions appearing on the soundtrack: "What About Us" and "Dead Practice".

A number of his songs also appear in other films, such as Wicked Lake (2008)—produced by Fever Dreams and ZP Studios—for which he composed the entire soundtrack that was released on his own 13th Planet record label—he also makes a small appearance in the film as an art school teacher.

In a November 2008 issue of Hustler Magazine, Jourgensen announced that Ministry was officially finished, as the band "[took] up so much time" and releasing new albums was difficult. He also explained that he was responsible for six other bands and could complete seven albums within a year when he was not working on new Ministry material. However, despite Jourgensen's insistence that Ministry would never return, a reunion was announced on August 7, 2011. A new album, entitled Relapse, was released on March 26, 2012.

At his 57th birthday listening party in Chicago he announced a new project called, SMM or Surgical Meth Machine. In an interview with In The Loop Magazine, Jourgensen stated, "I can't wait to get this record out. If you're a fan of Ministry, you're gonna freak out on this. It's got the whole range of my career as a musician in it even sound of earlier stuff from the beginning."

In 2016 March, Jourgensen noted he had a project with Arabian Prince; this collaboration was later confirmed for a new Ministry album.

Revolting Cocks 
Revolting Cocks, also known as RevCo, is an American industrial rock band that began as a musical side project for Richard 23 of Front 242, Luc van Acker, and Jourgensen. The band took their name after being involved in a fight in a Chicago bar in 1983: Jourgensen, Richard 23 and Van Acker, celebrating the formation of their new band with a few drinks, ended the evening in a brawl, with bar stools thrown through the windows. As he ejected the trio, the owner—a man who Jourgensen recalls was named Dess—shouted, "I'm calling the police! You guys are a bunch of revolting cocks!" The trio decided to use the name for their band.

The band have changed lineups several times. RevCo currently features Jourgensen (guitars, keyboards, programming, background vocals, producer), Josh Bradford (vocals, background vocals), Sin Quirin (guitars, bass, keyboards) and Clayton Worbeck (keyboards, programming, mixing, bass). Their seventh album, Sex-O Olympic-O, which was produced by Jourgensen at his studio, was released on his 13th Planet label in March 2008. The follow-up album, Got Cock?, was released in March 2010 on the same label. A remix album of Got Cock?, titled Got Mixxx?, was released in 2011.

Other bands and projects 
During the late 1980s, Jourgensen started a short-lived side project named 1000 Homo DJs, under the pseudonym Buck Satan. 1000 Homo DJs released two singles, including a cover of Black Sabbath's "Supernaut." Also in 1989, Jourgensen was involved in Acid Horse, a collaboration between the members of Ministry and Cabaret Voltaire. In 2015, Jourgensen announced that he started "a speed metal project" named Surgical Meth Machine with engineer and longtime collaborator Sam D'Ambruoso. The project's self-titled album was released on April 15, 2016.
More side projects

Special Affect
W.E.L.T.
Pailhead
Lard
Surgical Meth Machine

Production work 
Jourgensen and his Ministry bandmate Paul Barker worked as a music production team under the names Hypo Luxa and Hermes Pan, producing their own work as well as other Wax Trax! Records acts. Jourgensen also produced music for Reverend Horton Heat, Skinny Puppy, Dessau, Skrew, Rigor Mortis, The Blackouts, and DethRok. Jourgensen's recording complex for the 13th Planet label was located at his former home in El Paso, Texas.

Musicianship 
Jourgensen is known for playing a multitude of instruments throughout his professional career, including guitars, bass, violin, banjo, keyboards, piano, pedal steel guitar, trumpets and drums to name a few. However, he claims he is "not really good at any of them." He said, "I'm jack of all trades and master of none. But I can collage bits and pieces together musically."

Jourgensen's singing style has varied throughout the years. On Ministry's early releases such as With Sympathy and Twitch, he sang with a fake British accent, which he regrets. Inspired by The 13th Floor Elevators, Jourgensen started utilizing vocal effects beginning with The Land of Rape and Honey to distort his voice using Eventide. In 2006, starting with Rio Grande Blood, Jourgensen switched to a more thrash metal approach.

Personal life

Relationships and family 

Jourgensen was married to Patty Marsh from 1984 to 1995 and the relationship produced one daughter. In 2002, he married Angelina Lukacin. In July 2014, he announced that they were divorced.

Jourgensen's autobiography, Ministry: The Lost Gospels According to Al Jourgensen, was released in July 2013.

As a result of the divorce from wife and business partner, 13th Planet Records officially shut down . In 2015, Jourgensen closed his residence and recording studio in El Paso, Texas and moved to Los Angeles to pursue new music endeavors.

Legal and health issues 
In 1995, police raided Ministry's Texas headquarters and Jourgensen was arrested for possession of heroin. He received a five-year probation sentence. Jourgensen was dependent upon heroin for twenty years. Jourgensen kicked his heavy drug (heroin, methadone, crack, pills) habit, and as of 2019, he has limited his intake to beer, marijuana, and psilocybin mushrooms.

Jourgensen almost lost his arm and foot in two separate incidents, the first due to a spider bite, the second the result of a hypodermic needle wound.

Body art 
Throughout the years, Jourgensen has amassed a large number of tattoos. In 2012, he underwent facial piercings after a bet with his daughter; she called him a "pussy" for not having any piercings while Jourgensen called her the same thing for not having any tattoos. They then decided to have their tattoos and piercings done respectively to create a "pact." He had 16 facial piercings done in one sitting.

Discography

with Ministry

with Revolting Cocks

with Lard

Other releases

Featured releases

Solo releases

Notes

Commentaries

Reference notes

References

Cited sources

Bibliography

Further reading

External links 

 

1958 births
20th-century American guitarists
American musicians of Cuban descent
American male singers
Alternative metal musicians
American heavy metal singers
American heavy metal guitarists
American heavy metal keyboardists
American industrial musicians
Alternative metal guitarists
American multi-instrumentalists
American synth-pop musicians
Cuban emigrants to the United States
Hispanic and Latino American musicians
Illinois Democrats
Lard (band) members
Living people
Ministry (band) members
Musicians from Chicago
New Trier High School alumni
People from Breckenridge, Colorado
Musicians from Havana
Revolting Cocks members
Singers from Colorado
University of Illinois Chicago alumni
American male guitarists
Industrial metal musicians